Nipani is one of the famous village, taluk in the Belgaum district in the state of Karnataka, India. It is an important agricultural and commercial trade and education centre in the district. Nipani and its surrounding villages are known for growing high-quality tobacco, which is rolled into beedis.

The City Municipal Council of Nipani was constituted in 1987. The Nipani Taluk was constituted in March 2018.

Geography and climate
Since Nipani is close to the branches of the western ghats, it enjoys a good rainy season. Temperature ranges from 16 to 40 °C (61 to 104 °F). Nipani is at its coldest in winter (November through February). It is located 77 km From Belagavi and 39 km From Kolhapur.

Demographics
As of the 2011 India census, Nipani had a population of 62,865. Males constitute 50% of the population and females 50%. Nipani has an average literacy rate of 57%, higher than the national average of 59.5%: male literacy is 79%, and female literacy is 64%. In Nipani, 10% of the population is under 6 years of age. Kannada and Marathi are the official language in Nippani.

Business
Nipani is dependent mostly on agriculture and its local textile industry. Nipani is also well known for its Tobacco business, Beedi Factories, Tobacco Mills, foundry business, Tile Business, wood businesses and aluminium pot making factory.

Nipani is one of notable Tobacco trade market and producer in India. Nipani is surrounded by 4 sugar factories, one of it is Shri, Halsidhnath Sugar Factory -situated in Nipani and other three. One is situated near Bhoj Cross which is 20 km away from Nippani and other 2 are in nearing Maharashatra Border, Sada Sakhar Karkhana, Hamidawad and Jawahar Sahakari Sugar Factory in Hupari.

Education

Devchand College, KLE's G. I .Bagewadi College are the notable colleges in the area.

KLE's G.I. Bagewadi College of Arts, Commerce & Science is very well known college in the Nipani region. In 2017, NAAC gave A+ accreditation for the college, which is first in whole Karnataka to get A+. KLE society has built Independent PU College beside the KLE College of Pharmacy in Nipani.

VSM's Somashekhar R. Kothiwale Institute of Technology, Nipani is the only engineering college in Nipani Taluk.

Devchand College, formerly known as Janta College was established Padmabhushan Shriman Devchandji Shah in 1960, and is affiliated to Shivaji University, Kolhapur. Devchand College also host Yashwantrao Chavan Maharashtra Open University, Centre for distance education, Shivaji University, Kolhapur.

K.L.E's English Medium CBSE School, Nipani was established in the year 2004.

Tourism and attractions 

Nipani is 407 km from Mumbai and 166 km from Goa. There are tourists sites like Tavandi (Stavanidhi), Ramaling, Nipanikar Wada, Samadhi Math, Sai Mandir, and Jawahalal Nehru lake.

Ramling Mandir: This temple is dedicated to lord Shiva. Situated in Shippur Hill 6 km from Nipani, on Nipani Goa highway, it is believed to be held from Ramayan Yug. Beside its locations which is center of hill, the temple has regular and fresh water sources for the entire year. The temple hosts feast in Hindu month of Shravan, which comes in the monsoon season.

Tavandi (Stavanidhi), which is 5 km from Nipani, has four Jain temples. The huge idol of Brahmadev is visited by people from all sections of the society. There is a temple dedicated to Devi Padmavati between the main road and the Tirth Temple. The main temple at Stavanidhi has three Vedis. The first one is dedicated to Bhagwan Surparsvanath. An idol of Bhagwan Rishabdev of 11 A.D. is installed in this Chaitya. In the second Chaitya, an idol of Bagwan Parsvanath known as Navkhand (nine pieces). There are idols of Yaksha Brahmadev and Devi Padmavati in this Chaitya. The third Chaitya is dedicated to Yaksha Brahmadev which has a huge idol of Sindoori color. On the upper storey, a Shassterakut and Chamukha are there. The images in Kayotsang posture of Bhagwan Neminath, Baghwan Adinath, Bhagwan Parsvanath and Bhagwan Mahavir in Padmasan as Mulnayak are installed here. A fair is organized in the month of January on the night of Amavasya.

Visitors can stroll into the Nipanikar Wada and view the 19th century wall paintings. Around 4 km From Nipani in village boundary Called Shirgupping can find well-preserved aqueduct which was built by the founder of Nipani city H.H. Shrimant, Siddhoji raje Naik Nimbalkar, Nippankar Sarlashkar Desai Sarkar. This water channel is an Engineering marvel of 19th centuries water system which served city for century, its famous among locals by name "Udatya Bambache Pani". The aqueduct is location and the storage in city is around 5 km, water root still can be traced by chimney locally known as Udate Bamb.

Transportation 
Road

Nipani is connected by road via national highways 48 (now part of the Golden Quadrilateral connecting Delhi, Haryana, Rajasthan, Gujarat, Maharashtra, Karnataka and Tamil Nadu). North Western Karnataka Road Transport Corporation run buses to all corners of Karnataka and to neighboring states. There are many prominent private bus companies providing services to all major destinations in Karnataka and surrounding states. KSRTC services almost all villages in Karnataka. 92% villages are served by KSRTC (6743 out of 7298 Villages) and 44% in other areas (6743 out of 7298). KSRTC operates 6463 schedules in a day covering an effective distance of 23.74 lakh km with a total fleet of 7599 buses. It transports, on an average, 24.57 lakh passengers per day.

Rail

A new rail track for Belagavi-Karad via Nipani announced in 2016 will pass through Nippani and ensure rail connectivity to the town.

Politics
Nippani is an Assembly constituency in Chikkodi Lok Sabha constituency. Shashikala Annasaheb Jolle is the MLA of Nippani and her husband Annasaheb Jolle is the MP from Chikkodi Lok Sabha seat in 2019 Indian general elections

References

External links
 Nipani City Municipal Council

Cities and towns in Belagavi district